Branden Sison (born February 8, 2000) is a Canadian ice sledge hockey player. 

He competed at the 2022 Winter Paralympics in Para ice hockey, winning a silver medal.

He competed at the 2021 World Championships.

References

External links
 
 

2000 births
Living people
Canadian sledge hockey players
Paralympic sledge hockey players of Canada
Paralympic silver medalists for Canada
Paralympic medalists in sledge hockey
Para ice hockey players at the 2022 Winter Paralympics
Sportspeople from Edmonton
Medalists at the 2022 Winter Paralympics